Muhammad Imran Qureshi is a Pakistani politician who was a Member of the Provincial Assembly of the Punjab, from May 2013 to May 2018.

Early life and education
He was born on 24 June 1965 in Muzaffargarh.

He has the degree of Bachelor of Laws which he received in 1989 from Bahauddin Zakariya University.

Political career
He was elected to the Provincial Assembly of the Punjab from Constituency PP-256 (Muzaffargarh-VI) in 2008 Pakistani general election.

He was elected to the Provincial Assembly of the Punjab as a candidate of Pakistan Muslim League (Nawaz) from Constituency PP-256 (Muzaffargarh-VI) in 2013 Pakistani general election.

References

Living people
Punjab MPAs 2013–2018
1965 births
Pakistan Muslim League (N) politicians